Nick Brown (born 1950) is British Labour Party politician, MP for Newcastle upon Tyne and former government minister.

Nick Brown may also refer to:

 Nick Brown (tennis) (born 1961), British tennis player and coach
 Nicholas W. Brown (lawyer) (born 1977), United States Attorney and former Survivor contestant 
 Nick Brown (academic) (born 1962), British botanist and academic
 Nick Brown (umpire), Australian rules football umpire
 Nick Allen Brown (born 1978), American author and speaker

See also
 Nicholas Brown (disambiguation)